Flacher See is a lake in Klocksin, Mecklenburg-Vorpommern, Germany.

External links 
 

Lakes of Mecklenburg-Western Pomerania